The 2001 National Camogie League is a competition in the women's team field sport of camogie was won by Cork, who defeated Galway in the final, played at McDonagh Park, Nenagh. Cork completed an unprecedented run of seven National League titles in a row. Vivienne Harris became the first person to captain three National League winning camogie teams in succession.

Arrangements
The final was delayed because of the foot and mouth outbreak of 2001. Galway were in the throes of team building under new boss Billy Carr and coach Damian Coleman and the delay meant that Galway were without their seven (Pearses) players who had qualified for the All-Ireland club final. In addition Olivia Broderick had retired. Tipperary were beaten by Cork in their opening League match. Galway had the misfortune to have their opening match against Kilkenny postponed due to the foot-and-mouth alert.

The Final
Three goals from Jennifer O'Leary helped Cork win their seventh successive title. Galway got off to a flying start and were 0-6 to 0-1 after eleven minutes. Cork then came more into the game. In the 22nd minute, Lynn Dunlea scored a goal to put Cork back in the game. A minute later, Galway scored a point and managed to lead by just one point 0-7 to 1-3 at half-time. Jennifer O'Leary had the ball in the Galway net within a minute of the restart and scored her second goal six minutes later. O'Leary had her third goal in the 46th minute to leave 4-7 to 0-9 and further goals Catherine Corkery and Una O'Donoghue put the finishing touches on Cork’s victory.

Division 2
The Junior National League, known since 2006 as Division Two, was won by Cork intermediates who defeated Derry in the delayed final on November 4 at the Thomas Davis grounds in Dublin by 3-14 to 4-3. Two opening first half goals from Paula McAtamney had Derry ahead at the break 3-1 to 0-5. Cork turned on the power in the second half with three opening points from Ger Collins and Colette Desmond paving the way for victory.

Final stages

References

External links
Camogie Association

National Camogie League
2001